Kommugudem is a village in West Godavari district of the Indian state of Andhra Pradesh. It is located in Tadepalligudem mandal of Eluru revenue division. The nearest train station is Kaikaram (KKRM), located at a distance of 40.26 Km.

Demographics 

 Census of India, Kommigudem had a population of 5074. It comes under tribal area. The total population constitutes 2531 males and 2543 females with a sex ratio of 1005 females per 1000 males. 549 children are in the age group of 0–6 years, with the sex ratio of 1064. The average literacy rate stands at 66.01%.

References

Villages in West Godavari district